First Lady of Georgia is the title held by the wife of the sitting governor of Georgia. The first lady serves as the official hostess of the Georgia Governor's Mansion. 

The current first lady of Georgia is Marty Kemp, the wife of incumbent Governor Brian Kemp, who assumed office in 2019.

Role 
The position of the first lady is not an elected one, carries no official duties, and receives no salary. However, the first lady holds a highly visible position in state government. The role of the first lady is the host of the Georgia Governor's Mansion. She organizes and attends official ceremonies and functions of state either along with, or in place of, the governor. 

It is common for the governor's spouse to select specific, non-political, causes to promote. For example former first lady Sandra Deal is known for advocating for literacy and education throughout the state, for which the Georgia Association of Broadcasters awarded her their 2016 "Georgian of the Year" award.

List

References

External links 

 Office of First Lady Marty Kemp
 Past Governors Bios from the National Governors Association

Lists of spouses
Governor of Georgia (U.S. state)
Lists of people from Georgia (U.S. state)